Bristow is a city in Creek County, Oklahoma, United States. The population was 4,222 at the 2010 census, down 2.4 percent from the figure of 4,325 recorded in 2000.

History
Bristow began in 1898, when the St. Louis–San Francisco Railway ("SL&SF") built a track between Sapulpa and Oklahoma City. The town was named for Joseph L. Bristow, a U.S. senator from Kansas. A post office was established April 25, 1898. By the 1900 census, the population was 626.

Bristow was designated as the county seat for Creek County at statehood when its population was 1,134. However, the county held a special election on August 20, 1908, to decide whether the seat would remain in Bristow or move to Sapulpa, which claimed to be more centrally located. Bristow had a larger population and claimed to have better railroad connections. Sapulpa won the election, but Bristow claimed voting irregularities. The election was voided and a new vote was held November 20, 1912. Again, Sapulpa won the election and the title of county seat.

The local economy depended heavily on cotton. Bristow had seven cotton gins and two cottonseed oil mills in the early 20th century. Other farms in the surrounding area produced corn, peanuts, potatoes and fruit. Oil and gas were discovered in the area around 1915. The discovery led to the construction of three refineries and four pipeline companies by 1930. The Oklahoma-Southwestern Railway built a short line from a connection with the SL&SF at Bristow through the oilfields to Slick in 1920, but declining oilfield production and other factors lead to abandonment of that trackage in 1930.  The peak census population was 6,619 in 1930.

Geography
Bristow is located in northern Oklahoma, just south of the geographic center of Creek County. The geographic coordinates of Bristow are  (35.830720, -96.390675).

Interstate 44, the Turner Turnpike, passes through the northern part of the city, with access from Exit 196. Oklahoma State Highway 66, formerly U.S. Route 66, passes through the center of Bristow and generally parallels I-44.

Climate

Demographics

As of the census of 2000, there were 4,325 people, 1,793 households, and 1,161 families residing in the city. The population density was 1,299.2 people per square mile (501.5/km2). There were 2,019 housing units at an average density of 606.5 per square mile (234.1/km2). The racial makeup of the city was 75.42% White, 8.51% African American, 10.64% Native American, 0.16% Asian, 0.44% from other races, and 4.83% from two or more races. Hispanic or Latino of any race were 2.01% of the population.

There were 1,793 households, out of which 31.5% had children under the age of 18 living with them, 41.7% were married couples living together, 17.8% had a female householder with no husband present, and 35.2% were non-families. 32.1% of all households were made up of individuals, and 16.3% had someone living alone who was 65 years of age or older. The average household size was 2.37 and the average family size was 2.98.

In the city, the population was spread out, with 27.9% under the age of 18, 9.2% from 18 to 24, 24.4% from 25 to 44, 20.1% from 45 to 64, and 18.4% who were 65 years of age or older. The median age was 36 years. For every 100 females, there were 83.0 males. For every 100 females age 18 and over, there were 79.1 males.

The median income for a household in the city was $24,351, and the median income for a family was $31,618. Males had a median income of $28,475 versus $21,711 for females. The per capita income for the city was $13,819. About 15.8% of families and 20.9% of the population were below the poverty line, including 34.5% of those under age 18 and 14.3% of those age 65 or over.

Economy
From its inception, Bristow's economy centered on agriculture, and specifically on growing and processing cotton. By the early 1900s, Bristow had seven cotton gins and two cotton-seed oil mills. Additionally, other farmers in the area produced corn, peanuts, Irish potatoes, and fruits.

Oil and natural gas were discovered nearby in 1914 - 1915, producing an economic boom lasting until 1923. The boom also caused a population spike. According to the Encyclopedia of Oklahoma History and Culture, nearly 31,000 people lived within a few miles radius of Bristow in 1920.

Although the boom cooled by 1925, by 1930 the city was the site of three oil refineries, four pipeline facilities and offices for several petroleum-related companies.  KFRU, one of Oklahoma's first radio stations, started broadcasting from Bristow in January 1925.

Some manufacturing facilities were added during the 1960s, including Bristow Mattress Factory, the Glassmarc Corporation (manufacturer of fiberglass boats and other items), Artemis Incorporated (manufacturer of women's garments), and the U.S. Carpet Company.

Government
Bristow has a home rule form of government.

Transportation
Bristow is on Interstate 44, Oklahoma State Highway 66 (the old Route 66), Oklahoma State Highway 48, and Oklahoma State Highway 16.

Jones Memorial Airport (FAA ID: 3F7), about 3 miles to the southwest, contains a 4001’x75’ asphalt runway completed in June 2020.  The airport has an annual economic impact of $7.2 million.  Commercial flights go in and out of Tulsa International Airport, about 40 minutes away.

Rail freight service is provided by the Stillwater Central Railroad.  Passenger trains no longer stop in Bristow, but the Bristow Historical Train Depot & Museum is open for visitation, complete with the original wood floors from 1923.

Arts and entertainment
The Freeland Center for the Performing Arts opened in 2009.  The 795-seat theater cost $6.1 million, paid for by a combination of public and private funding.  The Center opened with a concert,  but is dedicated to diverse experiences which promote a spirit of cultural enjoyment.

The Bristow News, previously the Bristow News and Record Citizen, has been reporting events in Bristow and surrounding areas since 1899.

Parks and recreation
Klingensmith Park is a 320-acre facility featuring Lake Mesina, as well as the NRHP-listed Klingensmith Park Amphitheater, which was a WPA project from 1936 dedicated by Eleanor Roosevelt in 1937, and still in use.

The Town Square opens onto Historic Route 66/Main Street.  It is complete with a small amphitheater and is the site of many community activities.

Lincoln Park features a picnic table and playground equipment.

The Leon Pinson Sports Complex, previously the Bristow Sports Complex, has two softball fields and two baseball fields, as well as the Bristow Rodeo Grounds.

The VFW Post 3656 Wake Island Memorial, complete with a display of artillery and military equipment, commemorates the Battle of Wake Island during World War II.

Bristow Golf & Country Club has a public 9-hole regulation-length course.

Heyburn Lake is about 13 miles to the northeast.  RV and tent camping is available, and the lake features picnic areas, a playground, a boat launch, swimming and fishing.

NRHP Sites

Besides the Klingensmith Park Amphitheater, NRHP sites in Bristow include:

The old Beard Motor Company, a/k/a Bristow Chrysler Plymouth, at 210 E. 9th, being two blocks off Main near its intersection with the old Route 66.  Built in 1947, the facility is notable not only for its Art Moderne style, but also for its 75-foot tall Chrysler Plymouth sign out front, intended to be visible to Route 66 traffic.  This is not to be confused with the Bristow Motor Company Building at 500 N. Main, which is also NRHP-listed.

The Art Deco style Bristow Firestone Service Station at 321 N. Main, the Gothic Revival style Bristow Presbyterian Church at 6th and Elm, and the Creek Masonic Lodge No. 226 at 417 N. Main, are all substantial buildings that are NRHP-listed.

Highway-associated sites include the Texaco Service Station at 201 W. 4th Ave., the Bristow Tire Shop at 115 W. Fourth St., the Tank Farm Loop Route 66 Roadbed at the junction of SH-66 and Old Highway 66 0.6 miles west of the I-44 overpass, and the Little Deep Fork Creek Bridge east of the junction of E0830 Rd. and N3700 Rd.

Notable people
 Brent Ashabranner, Peace Corps administrator and author, lived in Bristow during his teen years in the 1930s
 Gene Autry, actor, rodeo performer, and singer known as The Singing Cowboy, was a telegrapher in Bristow's Frisco Train Depot, now known as the Bristow Historical Train Depot & Museum.
 Charles Crawford, football running back, Philadelphia Eagles (1986–1987)
 Josiah Henson, bronze medalist at the 1952 Summer Olympics
 Robert Hughes, Winningest boys high school basketball coach in the United States with 1,333 wins
 Clovis Maksoud, diplomat, writer, and journalist
 Tom Paxton, folk singer, moved to Bristow with his parents in 1948
 Albert A. Rollestone, philanthropist and oil pioneer, lived in Bristow 1915–1924
 Norma Smallwood, Miss America 1926, first Native American Miss America, married Thomas Gilcrease 1928
 Robert Symonds, actor
 Joe Lee Wilson, jazz singer

References

 
 https://www.taboulehfest.com/

External links
City of Bristow official website
The Bristow News
Bristow Historical Society and Museum

Cities in Creek County, Oklahoma
Cities in Oklahoma
Tulsa metropolitan area
Populated places established in 1898